Bark paper may refer to:

Amate, a form of paper manufactured in Mexico.
Banana paper, a paper made from the bark of the banana plant.
Dó paper, a paper traditionally produced in many villages in Vietnam.
Korean paper, traditional handmade paper from Korea.
Washi, a type of paper made in Japan.